Gallopin is a French surname. Notable people with the surname include:

Guy Gallopin (born 1956), French cyclist
Joël Gallopin (born 1953), French cyclist
Tony Gallopin (born 1988), French cyclist

French-language surnames